Beware is a 1946 American race film directed by Bud Pollard, and released by Astor Pictures. The film is also known as Beware! (American poster title).

Cast 
Louis Jordan as Lucius Brokenshire "Louis" Jordan
Frank H. Wilson as Prof. Drury
Emory Richardson as Dean Hargreaves
Valerie Black as Annabelle Brown
Milton Woods as Benjamin Ware III
Joseph Hiliard as Harry Jones (student)
Tommy Hix as Donald (student)
 Charles Johnson
John Frant as Joe
Ernest Calloway as Man in train station
Dimples Daniels as Long-legged Lizzie dancer
and "The Aristo-Genes" Girls Club

Tagline
"Look Up! Look Out! Look Sweet! the Maestro With a Beat"

Soundtrack 
"Beware, Brother, Beware"
"Long Legged Lizzie"
"You've Got To Have a Beat"
Louis Jordan and his orchestra - "Salt Pork, West Virginia" (Written by William Tennsyon Jr.)
Louis Jordan and his orchestra - "Don't Worry 'Bout That Mule" (Written by William Davis and Charles Stewart)
"The Land of the Buffalo Nickel"
"Good Morning Heartache"
"How Long Must I Wait"
Performed by Louis Jordan and his orchestra - "Old Fashion Passion" (Written by Claude Demetrius)

External links 

1946 films
1940s romantic musical films
American black-and-white films
Race films
African-American films
American romantic musical films
African-American musical films
1940s English-language films
1940s American films